The 18th Busan International Film Festival was held from October 3 to October 12, 2013 and was hosted by Aaron Kwok and Kang Soo-yeon.

The 10-day festival attracted 217,865 people despite the organizers having been forced to reschedule some events due to a typhoon. Upcoming filmmakers from South Korea and Mongolia won $30,000 for the New Currents Awards. Over 299 films from 70 countries were screened, with 94 world premieres and 40 international premieres. The event opened with Bhutanese film Vara: A Blessing and closed with the South Korean film The Dinner.

Program
† World premiere
†† International premiere

Opening Film

Gala Presentation

A Window on Asian Cinema

New Currents

Korean Cinema Today – Panorama

Korean Cinema Today – Vision

Korean Cinema Retrospective

Fly High, Run Far: The Making of Korean Master Im Kwon-taek

World Cinema

Flash Forward

Open Cinema

Special Program in Focus

Rogues, Rebels and Romantics: A Season of Irish Cinema

Unknown New Wave Central Asian Cinema

Park Cheol-soo Special Commemoration: Eternal Movie Youth

Midnight Passion

Wide Angle – Documentary Competition
Gureombi –The Wind Is Blowing – Cho Sung-bong (South Korea) 
Dream House by the Border – Kim Kyang (South Korea) 
Jazz in Love – Baby Ruth Villarama (Philippines/Germany/France) 
Non-fiction Diary – Jung Yoon-suk (South Korea)
Past Present – Tion Guan Saw (Malaysia) 
Tale of a Butcher Shop – Aya Hanabusa (Japan) 
To Singapore, with Love – Tan Pin Pin (Singapore) 
Sandal – Kim Mi-re (South Korea) 
Streetside – Daniel Ziv (Indonesia)

Awards 
New Currents Award  
Pascha – Ahn Seon-Kyoung (South Korea)
Remote Control – Byamba Sakhya (Mongolia/Germany)
Special Mention: Transit – Hannah Espia (Philippines)
Sonje Award
A Lady Caddy Who Never Saw a Hole in One – Yosep Anggi Noen (Indonesia)
In the Summer – Son Tae-gyum (South Korea)
Special Mention: Temporary – Behzad Azadi (Iran)
Special Mention: Sprout – Yoon Ga-eun (Korea)
BIFF Mecenat Award
Streetside – Daniel Ziv (Indonesia)
Non-fiction Diary – Jung Yoon-suk (South Korea)
Special Mention: Gureombi – The Wind Is Blowing – Cho Sung-bong (Korea)
Busan Bank Award (Audience Award)
Home – Maximilian Hult (Sweden/Iceland)
KNN Movie Award (Audience Award)
10 Minutes – Lee Yong-seung (South Korea)
FIPRESCI Award
10 Minutes – Lee Yong-seung (South Korea)
NETPAC Award
Shuttlecock – Lee Yu-bin (South Korea)
Busan Cinephile Award
Father's Garden –The Love of My Parents – Peter Liechti (Switzerland)
Citizen Reviewers' Award
Shuttlecock – Lee Yu-bin (South Korea)
Han Gong-ju – Lee Su-jin (South Korea)
CGV Movie Collage Award
Han Gong-ju – Lee Su-jin (South Korea)
The Asian Filmmaker of the Year – Rithy Panh (Cambodia)
Korean Cinema Award – Charles Tesson (France)

References

External links 
 BIFF official website

Busan International Film Festival
Busan International Film Festival
2013 in South Korea
Busan International Film Festival
2013 festivals in South Korea